Buri (sometimes transliterated as Boori) is a village located in the Kingdom of Bahrain. The village is said to be one of the oldest villages in the country.

Location
It is situated in the Northern Governorate administrative region. The village itself lies west of the town of A'ali.

Sport
Buri has its own youth football team and participates in local football tournaments.

References

Populated places in the Northern Governorate, Bahrain